Gilla Asalta (died 1172) was an Irish historian.

Gilla Asalta appears to be solely known via an obituary in the Annals of Tigernach under the year 1172, which states:

 Gilla Asalta, senchaidh Ruaidhrí Uí Concobair ríg Erenn, ard-shái na n-Gaidhel ina aimsir, mortuus est/Gilla Asalta, chief historian of Ruaidrí Ua Conchobair king of Ireland, the chief sage of the Gaels in his time, died.

External links
 http://www.ucc.ie/celt/published/G100002/index.html

12th-century Irish historians
1172 deaths
People from County Galway
People from County Roscommon
Year of birth unknown